Roseovarius indicus is a Gram-negative, rod-shaped and non-motile bacterium from the genus of Roseovarius which has been isolated from deep sea-water from the Indian Ocean.

References 

Rhodobacteraceae
Bacteria described in 2011